The New Zealand cricket team toured in July 2022 to play two Twenty20 International (T20I) matches and a single One Day International (ODI). The matches were all played at The Grange Club in Edinburgh. The fixtures in Scotland made up the third leg of New Zealand's tour of the United Kingdom and Ireland, following a Test series in England and limited overs fixtures in Ireland.

New Zealand won the opening T20I match by 68 runs, after Finn Allen scored 101 runs. New Zealand scored their highest team total in a T20I match in the second fixture, with 254/5, with them going on to win by 102 runs and take the series 2–0. New Zealand won the one-off ODI match by seven wickets, with Mark Chapman scoring 101 not out. It was Chapman's first ODI century for New Zealand, after he had previously scored one for Hong Kong in November 2015.

Background
The New Zealand cricket team was scheduled to tour Scotland in June 2020 to play a One Day International (ODI) match and a Twenty20 International (T20I) match. It would have been the first time since 2008 that the New Zealand team have toured Scotland. New Zealand were also scheduled to tour Ireland in the same month to play three ODIs and three Twenty20 Internationals (T20Is). Originally scheduled to be a one-off ODI match, Cricket Scotland announced the addition of the T20I match in December 2019.

The COVID-19 pandemic put the tour in doubt. In April 2020, David White, Chief Executive of New Zealand Cricket, said that the tour would be "most unlikely" to happen. Later the same month, Gus Mackay, Chief Executive of Cricket Scotland, said that they were willing to host the matches behind closed doors if necessary. However, the tour was postponed on 15 May 2020 as a result of the pandemic.

Squads

Adam Milne was ruled out of New Zealand's squad due to an Achilles injury with Jacob Duffy named as his replacement.

T20I series

1st T20I

2nd T20I

Only ODI

References

External links
 Series home at ESPN Cricinfo

2020 in New Zealand cricket
2022 in New Zealand cricket
2020 in Scottish cricket
2022 in Scottish cricket
International cricket competitions in 2022
New Zealand cricket tours of Scotland
Cricket events postponed due to the COVID-19 pandemic